Medusafishes are a family, Centrolophidae, of percomorph fishes. The family includes about 31 species. They are found in temperate and tropical waters throughout the world.

Young Icichthys lockingtoni specimens are abundant in the coastal waters of the north Pacific, where they are often found in association with jellyfish, which provide them with protection from predators and opportunities to scavenge the remains of the jellyfishes' meals.

Genera
The following genera are classified within the family Centrolophidae:

 Centrolophus Lacépède, 1802
 Hyperoglyphe Günther, 1859
 Icichthys Jordan & Gilbert, 1880
 Psenopsis Gill, 1862
 Schedophilus Cocco, 1839
 Seriolella Guichenot, 1848
 Tubbia Whitley, 1943

Timeline of genera

References 

 

 
Scombriformes
Taxa named by Charles Lucien Bonaparte